Adam Pajer (born 2 May 1995) is a Czech footballer who last played as a defender for Pohronie.

Career

FK Mladá Boleslav
Pajer made his professional debut for Mladá Boleslav against Viktoria Plzeň on 19 October 2014.

FK Pohronie
On 24 June 2021, Pohronie announced the signing of Pajer on a two-year contract. Pajer commented on the transfer positively, citing excitement by top division opportunities in a small but functioning club. Pohronie got relegated in the season and subsequently, Pajer had left the club.

References

External links
 Eurofotbal profile 
  
 Futbalnet Profile 

1995 births
Living people
Sportspeople from Mladá Boleslav
Czech footballers
Czech expatriate footballers
Association football defenders
FK Mladá Boleslav players
FK Varnsdorf players
FK Senica players
Slovak Super Liga players
FK Poprad players
FK Železiarne Podbrezová players
FK Pohronie players
Czech First League players
2. Liga (Slovakia) players
Expatriate footballers in Slovakia
Czech expatriate sportspeople in Slovakia